A Summer Story is a British drama film released in 1988, directed by Piers Haggard, based on John Galsworthy’s 1916 short story "The Apple Tree", with a script by Penelope Mortimer. It stars James Wilby, Imogen Stubbs, and Susannah York.

In 1904, a young gentleman visiting a rural area has an intense love affair with a village girl. Eighteen years later, he is passing that way again.

Plot
In the summer of 1904 Frank Ashton (James Wilby), an educated young man from London, is on a walking holiday in Devon with a friend. When he falls and twists his ankle, Ashton is helped at a nearby farmhouse and stays there for a few days to recover, while his friend goes on. Ashton quickly falls for the village girl who looks after him, Megan David (Imogen Stubbs), and she falls in love with him, to the great distress of her cousin Joe Narracombe (Jerome Flynn), who wants Megan for himself. Ashton and Megan spend several nights together, and after that he takes the train to a seaside town to cash a cheque at a bank, promising to return the next morning and take Megan away with him and marry her.

On arrival in the town, Ashton finds a branch of his bank, but it will not cash his cheque, insisting on first contacting his branch in London. 
While he is delayed, Ashton meets an old school friend, staying at a local hotel with his three sisters, of whom the oldest is Stella Halliday (Sophie Ward). Thanks to the bank's delays, he misses the train he needed to catch to make his rendezvous with Megan. During the day that follows, he spends more time with his friend and his sisters, and while Stella flirts with him he begins to have second thoughts about marrying Megan.

Megan then travels to the seaside town looking for Ashton, carrying her luggage for running away. He sees her on the beach and follows her into the town, but when she turns and catches a glimpse of him, he hides.

Eighteen years later, Ashton is married to Stella and they are motoring through Devon. They have no children. Ashton visits the farm where he seduced Megan and is recognized. He learns that Megan was heart-broken about losing him and also that she died soon after giving birth to a son, whom she named "Francis," or Frank. He is taken to see Megan's grave, which is at the spot where they had first met. She had asked to be buried there, to wait for his return. While motoring away with Stella, Ashton passes Megan's son, young Frank, who gives him a friendly wave.

Cast

 James Wilby - Frank Ashton 
 Imogen Stubbs - Megan David
 Susannah York - Mrs. Narracombe 
 Kenneth Colley - Jim 
 Jerome Flynn - Joe Narracombe 
 Lee Billett - Nick 
 Oliver Perry - Rick 
 Harry Burton - Garton 
 Sophie Ward - Stella Halliday 
 John Elmes - Mr. Halliday 
 Camilla Power - Sabina Halliday 
 Juliette Fleming - Freda Halliday 
 Sukie Smith - Betsy 
 John Savident - Bank Clerk 
 Rachel Joyce - Post Office Girl
 Patrick Morris - Pierrot 1
 Paul Allain - Pierrot 2
 Christopher Majeika - Pierrot 3
 James Wilson - Pierrot 4
 Perry Cree - Pierrot 5

Production
In 1946 Jesse Jasky Jr announced he would make a film of the story from a script by De Witt Bodeen at RKO, but nothing came of it. In 1969, Kenneth Hyman said he wanted to make his directorial debut with a film version of the story, which would be made for under $800,000, but again no movie resulted.

In 1971 Peter Bogdanovich said he had wanted to make a film of the story "since he was about 16", but wanted to change the setting to Maine.

In 1987, a production was at last funded, based on a script by Penelope Mortimer,  and James Wilby, Imogen Stubbs, and Susannah York were cast in the leading roles. Despite being set on Dartmoor, the rural scenes were mostly filmed on Exmoor, specifically at Lyncombe Farm. Other scenes were filmed in Exeter, Dartmouth, and Sidmouth.

Penelope Mortimer had written the film script long before, in the 1960s, when she was working as a screenwriter. "I took the money and ran and totally forgot about it," she said in 1988. "I couldn't remember a thing about it", adding that "the last apple got written out [of the script] a week before shooting - it was the wrong time of year." She made some changes to the original story, including adding a sheep-shearing party ("I thought, something has to happen", Mortimer commented on this), and the producers decided that Megan and Frank needed to make love, resulting in Megan having a son. "I don't know what Galsworthy would have thought", said Mortimer  "I was terribly anxious that the couple should never have it off. But oh no they had to have all those muscles writhing in the moonlight."

Mortimer called the character of Frank Ashton "very much a Galsworthy character, someone with the guilt of not living up to his own expectations. Such a bastard but with the best gentlemanly motives... such a yuppie. I'm sure there are still plenty of young men with their BMWs who act much the same way." She said the character of Megan was "a bit of a hoyden... pretty amoral really but with a lot of guts. And Imogen Stubbs... is sensational."

References

External links
 
Review at Los Angeles Times
Review at Letterbox DVD
Review at Variety

Films based on works by John Galsworthy
1988 films
1988 romantic drama films
Atlantic Entertainment Group films
British romantic drama films
Films scored by Georges Delerue
Films about vacationing
Films based on short fiction
Films directed by Piers Haggard
Films set in 1902
Films set in 1922
Films set in Devon
ITC Entertainment films
1980s historical films
British historical films
1980s English-language films
1980s British films